Javier Sánchez defeated Guillermo Pérez Roldán 6–2, 7–6 to win the 1988 Buenos Aires Grand Prix singles competition. Perez-Roldan was the defending champion.

Seeds

  Guillermo Pérez Roldán (final)
  Jay Berger (quarterfinals)
  Alberto Mancini (semifinals)
  Horacio de la Peña (second round)
  Eduardo Bengoechea (quarterfinals)
  Franco Davín (first round)
  Javier Sánchez (champion)
  Raúl Viver (first round)

Draw

Finals

Top half

Bottom half

External links
 1988 ATP Buenos Aires Singles draw

Singles